The Oakland Athletics' 1985 season involved the A's finishing 4th in the American League West with a record of 77 wins and 85 losses. While the Athletics' on-field performance continued to disappoint, the debut of slugger Jose Canseco gave fans a measure of hope.

Offseason
December 5, 1984: Rickey Henderson, Bert Bradley and cash were traded by the Athletics to the New York Yankees for Stan Javier, Jay Howell, José Rijo, Eric Plunk, and Tim Birtsas.
December 7, 1984: Ray Burris, Eric Barry (minors) and a player to be named later were traded by the Athletics to the Milwaukee Brewers for Don Sutton. The Athletics completed the deal by sending Ed Myers (minors) to the Brewers on March 25, 1985.
December 8, 1984: Bill Caudill was traded by the Athletics to the Toronto Blue Jays for Alfredo Griffin, Dave Collins, and cash.
February 5, 1985: Rob Picciolo was signed as a free agent with the Oakland Athletics.

Regular season
September 2, 1985: José Canseco made his major league debut in a game against the Baltimore Orioles. Canseco had one at bat without a hit.
September 9, 1985:  Canseco hits his first career major league home run off the Texas Ranger's Jeff Russell in a 3-1 loss.
September 22, 1985: José Canseco became the 27th player to hit a home run over the roof of Comiskey Park.

Season standings

Record vs. opponents

Transactions
April 15, 1985: Bob Owchinko was signed as a free agent with the Oakland Athletics.
April 26, 1985: Bill Mooneyham was signed as a free agent by the Athletics.
July 12, 1985: Tommy John was signed as a free agent by the Athletics.
July 17, 1985: Bob Owchinko was purchased by the Chicago White Sox from the Oakland Athletics.
September 10, 1985: Don Sutton was traded by the Athletics to the California Angels for players to be named later. The Angels completed the deal by sending Robert Sharpnack (minors) and Jerome Nelson (minors) to the Athletics on September 25.

Draft picks
June 3, 1985: 1985 Major League Baseball Draft
Walt Weiss was drafted by the Athletics in the 1st round (11th pick). Player signed June 5, 1985.
Dave Otto was drafted by the Athletics in the 2nd round.
Wally Whitehurst was drafted by the Athletics in the 3rd round.
Jim Pena was drafted by the Athletics in the 24th round, but did not sign.

Roster

Player stats

Batting

Starters by position 
Note: Pos = Position; G = Games played; AB = At bats; H = Hits; Avg. = Batting average; HR = Home runs; RBI = Runs batted in

Other batters 
Note: G = Games played; AB = At bats; H = Hits; Avg. = Batting average; HR = Home runs; RBI = Runs batted in

Pitching

Starting pitchers 
Note: G = Games pitched; IP = Innings pitched; W = Wins; L = Losses; ERA = Earned run average; SO = Strikeouts

Other pitchers 
Note: G = Games pitched; IP = Innings pitched; W = Wins; L = Losses; ERA = Earned run average; SO = Strikeouts

Relief pitchers 
Note: G = Games pitched; W = Wins; L = Losses; SV = Saves; ERA = Earned run average; SO = Strikeouts

Farm system 

LEAGUE CHAMPIONS: Huntsville

References

External links
1985 Oakland Athletics team page at Baseball Reference
1985 Oakland Athletics team page at www.baseball-almanac.com

Oakland Athletics seasons
Oakland Athletics
Oak